Heros spurius is a species of cichlid fish native to the Guaporé River drainage in the Amazon basin in South America.

References 

spurius
Fish of South America
Taxa named by Johann Jakob Heckel
Fish described in 1840